Jörg Kempenich (born 30 May 1965) is a German fencer. He competed in the sabre events at the 1988 and 1992 Summer Olympics.  He won a bronze medal in both the 1990, and 1991 World Championships, as well as a silver in the 1989 Worlds.

References

External links
 

1965 births
Living people
German male fencers
Olympic fencers of West Germany
Olympic fencers of Germany
Fencers at the 1988 Summer Olympics
Fencers at the 1992 Summer Olympics
Sportspeople from Bonn
Universiade medalists in fencing
Universiade bronze medalists for Germany
Medalists at the 1991 Summer Universiade
Medalists at the 1993 Summer Universiade